Erzsébet Dolník (née Erzsébet Czirók 13 May 1940 in Bratislava – 12 April 2021)  was a Slovak politician. She served as an MP of the National Council between 2002 - 2006, serving as a replacement for Árpád Duka-Zólyomi, who became a Member of the European Parliament. In 2011, she was stripped of Slovak citizenship after publicly admitting she applied for and received Hungarian citizenship in spite of double-nationality ban in effect in Slovakia. Dolník unsuccessfully tried to contest the matter at the European Court of Human Rights.

References

1940 births
2021 deaths
Party of the Hungarian Community politicians
Members of the National Council (Slovakia) 2002-2006
Politicians from Bratislava
Female members of the National Council (Slovakia)